The 1978 United States Senate election in Illinois took place on November 7, 1978.  Incumbent Republican United States Senator Charles H. Percy ran for re-election to a third term in the United States Senate. Percy was opposed by Democratic nominee Alex Seith, an attorney who had been appointed to several local government positions.

Though Percy had been originally been expected to have an easy to reelection over Seith, a first-time candidate, the election quickly became competitive.

, this was the last time the Republicans won the Class 2 Senate seat in Illinois, and also the last time a Republican Senate candidate has carried Cook County.

Election information
The primary (held on March 21) and general election coincided with those for House and state elections.

Turnout
Turnout in the primaries was 19.88%, with a total of 1,171,744 votes cast.

Turnout during the general election was 54.82%, with 3,184,764 votes cast.

Democratic primary

Candidates
Anthony R. Martin-Trigona, political activist
Alex Seith, Chairman of the Cook County Zoning Board of Appeals

Results

Republican primary

Candidates
Lawrence Joseph Sarsfield Daly, perennial candidate
Charles H. Percy, incumbent

Results

General election

Candidates 
Bruce Lee Green (Libertarian)
 Patricia Grogan (Socialist Workers)
 Charles H. Percy, incumbent (Republican)
 Gerald Rose (Socialist Labor)
 Alex Seith, Chairman of the Cook County Zoning Board of Appeals (Democratic)

Campaign
Though Percy had been expected to coast to re-election over Seith, a first-time candidate, the election quickly became competitive. In the last few days of the campaign, a desperate Percy ran a television advertisement that featured him apologizing and acknowledging that, "I got your message and you're right." Percy's last-ditch effort appeared to have paid off, as he was able to edge out Seith to win what would end up being his third and final term in the Senate.

Results 
According to an NBC News exit poll, Percy won 50% of black voters, 54% of voters 35 years old or young, and 58% of Jewish voters.

See also 
 1978 United States Senate elections

References 

Illinois
1978
1978 Illinois elections